Attorney General Bullock may refer to:

J. Russell Bullock (1815–1899), Attorney General of Rhode Island
Steve Bullock (American politician) (born 1966), Attorney General of Montana

See also
General Bullock (disambiguation)